Buwalda is a Dutch surname. Notable people with the surname include:

 Peter Buwalda (born 1971), Dutch novelist and journalist
 Robin Buwalda (born 1994), Dutch footballer
 Sytse Buwalda (born 1965), Dutch counter-tenor
 William Buwalda (1869–1946), American soldier

Dutch-language surnames